Niksa Stojkovski (born 5 May 1994) is a Norwegian swimmer. He competed in the men's 50 metre freestyle event at the 2018 FINA World Swimming Championships (25 m), in Hangzhou, China. In 2019, he represented Norway at the 2019 World Aquatics Championships in Gwangju, South Korea.

References

External links
 

1994 births
Living people
Norwegian male freestyle swimmers
Place of birth missing (living people)
21st-century Norwegian people